The 2018 Rally Catalunya (formally known as the 54. RallyRACC Catalunya-Costa Daurada) was a motor racing event for rally cars that took place between 25 and 28 October. The event was open to entries competing in World Rally Cars and cars complying with Group R regulations. It marked the fifty-fourth running of Rally Catalunya and was the twelfth round of the 2018 FIA World Rally Championship, the highest class of competition in international rallying. Seventy-six crews, including manufacturer teams and privateers, were entered to compete in the World Rally Championship, the FIA World Rally Championship-2 and FIA World Rally Championship-3 support series and the Spanish national Rally Championship and Peugeot Rally Cup Ibérica championship. The 2018 event was based in Salou in Tarragona and consisted of eighteen special stages.

Kris Meeke and Paul Nagle were the reigning rally winners, but did not defend their win after Meeke was fired from Citroën. The Finnish crew of Teemu Suninen and Mikko Markkula were the reigning winners of the World Rally Championship-2, but did not defend their title as they will compete in the World Rally Championship class. Nil Solans and Miquel Ibáñez Sotos were the reigning World Rally Championship-3 winners, but Marc Martí replaced Ibáñez Sotos as Solans' co-driver in the WRC-2 category.

Nine-time world champions Sébastien Loeb and Daniel Elena won the rally for the first time since 2013 Rally Argentina. The victory also marked Loeb the third oldest winner overall. The margin between second-place Sébastien Ogier was 2.9 seconds, which also made the rally become the tenth closest wins in history. The Škoda Motorsport II crew of Kalle Rovanperä and Jonne Halttunen won in the World Rally Championship-2 in a Škoda Fabia R5, while the Italian crew of Enrico Brazzoli and Luca Beltrame won in the World Rally Championship-3.
The Czech crew of Jan Kopecký and Pavel Dresler finished second in WRC-2, which made them the drivers' and co-drivers' champions of 2018 World Rally Championship-2 respectively.

Background

Championship standings prior to the event
Thierry Neuville and Nicolas Gilsoul entered the round as the leaders of the World Rally Championship for Drivers and the World Rally Championship for Co-Drivers respectively. They held a seven-point lead over defending World Champions Sébastien Ogier and Julien Ingrassia. Ott Tänak and Martin Järveoja were third, a further fourteen points behind. In the World Rally Championship for Manufacturers, Toyota Gazoo Racing WRT held a twenty-point lead over Hyundai Shell Mobis WRT.

In the World Rally Championship-2 standings, Jan Kopecký and Pavel Dresler led the drivers' and co-drivers' standings by fourteen points. Pontus Tidemand and Jonas Andersson were in second place, but they did not contest the rally. Tidemand was forty-one points ahead of privateers Gus Greensmith in the drivers' standings, while Andersson held a forty-six points lead over Jonne Halttunen in the co-drivers' standings. Škoda Motorsport II held a forty-twenty-point lead over sister team Škoda Motorsport in the teams' championship.

Junior World Rally Champion Emil Bergkvist led the World Rally Championship-3 drivers' standings, three points cleared of Taisko Lario. Denis Rådström was another three points behind in third. In the World Rally Championship-3 co-drivers' standings, Tatu Hämäläinen led Johan Johansson by three points, while Romain Courbon was slender one point further behind. In the teams' championship, ACI Team Italia led Castrol Ford Team Turkiye by sixteen points.

Entry list
The following crews were entered into the rally. The entry list consisted of seventy-six crews, including thirteen World Rally Car entries, twenty-one entries in the World Rally Championship-2 and four in the World Rally Championship-3.

Itinerary

Report

Pre-event

The rally marked Volkswagen's return to the World Championship with a factory-supported team after the company withdrew from the category in 2016. Volkswagen Motorsport will enter two Volkswagen Polo GTIs built to Group R5 specifications in the World Rally Championship-2 support series. They will be driven by 2003 World Drivers' Champion Petter Solberg and M-Sport regular Eric Camilli.

Leg 1
Ott Tänak showed his speed once again in Spain. He pulled away from everyone except his teammate Jari-Matti Latvala, who set three fastest stage times during the day. However, an unexpected puncture cost the Finn around fifty seconds, leaving him fifth at the end of day 1. Local hero Dani Sordo led Hyundai in second, followed by Elfyn Evans in third in a Ford Fiesta WRC. Nine-time world champion Sébastien Loeb stalled his C3 at the opening stage in Barcelona, but he managed to recover to fourth place overall, just half a second off the podium. Sixth-place Andreas Mikkelsen was unable to find his form in the morning loop, but a setting adjustment put him on a charge and allowed him to end the day ahead of defending world champion Sébastien Ogier, who was fastest in Shakedown and the 2.97-kilometer-long street stage on Thursday. Craig Breen was in fifth before the final stage despite a spin, but the Irishman lost a chunk of his C3's rear wing and dropped to eighth overall. Championship leader Thierry Neuville didn't start well. The Belgian rolled his Hyundai i20 Coupe WRC at the Shakedown and damaged to the front left, the bonnet and roof. Being first on the road, he was also struggling with his car's handling. He eventually finished the day nearly one minute off the lead in ninth overall ahead of Esapekka Lappi, who slid off the road in the morning and spun later on.

Leg 2
Tyre choice was crucial on day 2. Toyota duo Ott Tänak and Jari-Matti Latvala chose full wet tyres for the morning loop and set brilliant pace. Despite their tyre choices, rally leader Tänak plunged to eighth after changing a front-left punctured tyre cost them about two minutes of time, which made local hero Dani Sordo the new rally leader. Stage conditions changed in the afternoon, meaning crews who chose wet tyres unable to match the pace set by those who used slick tyres. Championship leader Thierry Neuville benefited from slicks, finishing the day in fifth, 12.7 seconds off the lead. Teammate Sordo didn't have a good run. Although he made the same choice as Neuville, he encountered muddy roads due to being lower in the running order, which dropped him down to sixth. 

After the chaotic leg 2, Latvala led the rally, just 4.7 seconds ahead of defending world champion Sébastien Ogier, who took his chance with wet weather tyres in the afternoon and gained three places. Nine-time world champion Sébastien Loeb was 3.3 seconds further behind, edging Elfyn Evans by 1.8 seconds. Hyundai's Neuville and Sordo ended in fifth and sixth respectively. The top six crews were separated by just twenty seconds. Esapekka Lappi completed the day in seventh after a lurid sixth-gear spin, followed by early leader Tänak. Craig Breen had two spins in the day and finished ahead of Andreas Mikkelsen in tenth.

Leg 3
Choosing the hard compound tyre, Sébastien Loeb charged into the lead and eventually won his first rally since 2013 Rally Argentina. This was also Citroën's first rally victory of the season. Defending world champion Sébastien Ogier found something extra in his Ford Fiesta WRC and completed the rally in second with four additional Power Stage points. The Frenchman will go to Rally Australia as the championship leader. Teammate Elfyn Evans also found his form in the rally and successfully held the Hyundai drivers Thierry Neuville — who suffered an unexpected puncture caused by a stone at the last few kilometers of the event — and Dani Sordo behind to snatch his second podium finish of the year. Jari-Matti Latvala was leading, but another puncture in the second-last stage pushed him down to sixth. He eventually finished the rally in eighth after giving positions to his title contender teammate Ott Tänak and Esapekka Lappi respectively, with Craig Breen and Andreas Mikkelsen completing the top ten finishers.

Classification

Final results

Point scorers

Special stages

Power stage
The Power stage was a 14.50 km stage at the end of the rally. Additional World Championship points were awarded to the five fastest crews.

Penalties
The following crews were given time penalties during the rally.

Retirements
The following crews retired from the event. Under Rally2 regulations, they were eligible to re-enter the event starting from the next leg. Crews that re-entered were given an additional time penalty.

Championship standings after the rally
Bold text indicates 2018 World Champions.

Drivers' championships

Co-Drivers' championships

Manufacturers' and teams' championships

Notes

References

External links 
  
 2018 Rally de Catalunya in e-wrc website
 The official website of the World Rally Championship

Spain
2018
2018 in Spanish motorsport
2018 in Catalan sport
October 2018 sports events in Spain